Indiana Academy may refer:

Indiana Academy, a private Seventh-Day Adventist high school in Cicero, Indiana. 
Indiana Academy for Science, Mathematics, and Humanities, a public charter school located on the Ball State University campus.
Indiana E-Learning Academy is a joint program of the Intelenet Commission and the Indiana Department of Education.